Rank comparison chart of enlisted for all armies of Post-Soviet states.

Enlisted (OR 1–9)

References

See also
Comparative army enlisted ranks of Asia
Comparative army enlisted ranks of Europe

Military comparisons